Colombia competed at the 2011 World Championships in Athletics from August 27 to September 4 in Daegu, South Korea.

Team selection

A team of 21 athletes was
announced to represent the country
in the event.  The team is led by triple jumper Caterine Ibargüen, the new
continental record holder.

The following athletes appeared on the preliminary Entry List, but not on the Official Start List of the specific event, resulting in total number of 20 competitors:

Medalists
The following Colombian competitors won medals at the Championships

Results

Men

Women

References

External links
Official local organising committee website
Official IAAF competition website

Nations at the 2011 World Championships in Athletics
World Championships in Athletics
Colombia at the World Championships in Athletics